Günther Ullerich (30 April 1928 – 28 November 2007) was a German field hockey player who competed in the 1952 Summer Olympics, in the 1956 Summer Olympics, and in the 1960 Summer Olympics.
He won a bronze metal.
Ullerich played for Rot-Weiss Köln. In 1951 he made his debut in the German national hockey team. At the 1952 Olympics, the team retired in the quarterfinals against the later Olympic Second from the Netherlands. Four years later, the German team arrived at the Olympic Games in Melbourne, the semi-finals, where the team defeated the Indian team, in the bronze medal game, the Germans won 3–1 against the British. On his third Olympic participation in 1960 in Rome Ullerich defeated the German team in the quarterfinals later Olympic champions from Pakistan and finished seventh. In total, Ullerich worked from 1951 to 1961 with in 58 international matches.

References

External links
 

1928 births
2007 deaths
German male field hockey players
Olympic field hockey players of Germany
Olympic field hockey players of the United Team of Germany
Field hockey players at the 1952 Summer Olympics
Field hockey players at the 1956 Summer Olympics
Field hockey players at the 1960 Summer Olympics
Olympic bronze medalists for the United Team of Germany
Olympic medalists in field hockey
Medalists at the 1956 Summer Olympics
20th-century German people